ICARUS is a scientific journal dedicated to the field of planetary science.  It is officially endorsed by the American Astronomical Society's Division for Planetary Sciences (DPS). The journal contains articles discussing the results of new research on astronomy, geology, meteorology, physics, chemistry, biology, and other scientific aspects of the Solar System or extrasolar systems.

The journal was founded in 1962, and became affiliated with the DPS in 1974. Its original owner and publisher was Academic Press, which was purchased by Elsevier in 2000.

The journal is named for the mythical Icarus, and the frontispiece of every issue contains an extended quotation from Sir Arthur Eddington equating Icarus' adventurousness with the scientific investigator who "strains his theories to the breaking-point till the weak joints gape."

Abstracting and indexing
This journal is indexed by the following services:
 Science Citation Index
 Current Contents /Physical, Chemical & Earth Sciences
 Computer & control abstracts  
 Electrical & electronics abstracts   
 Physics abstracts. Science abstracts. Series A 
 GeoRef 
 Chemical Abstracts Service 
 International aerospace abstracts 
 Energy research abstracts

References

External links
 

Planetary science journals
Astronomy journals
Publications established in 1962
Elsevier academic journals
American Astronomical Society academic journals